United Nations Security Council Resolution 2061 was unanimously adopted on 25 July 2012. It extended the mandate for the United Nations Assistance Mission for Iraq by another 12 months.

See also 
List of United Nations Security Council Resolutions 2001 to 2100

References

External links
Text of the Resolution at undocs.org

 2061
 2061
2012 in Iraq
July 2012 events